WJIS 88.1 FM, known on air as The JOY FM, is a Christian adult contemporary station serving North, Central and Southwest Florida, including the Sarasota/Bradenton and Tampa Bay areas, and is owned by the Radio Training Network.

Network

On April 19, 2021, RTN launched The Joy FM on WNUE-FM 98.1, which the organization concurrently filed to buy from Entravision Communications for $4 million.

During most of 2013, WJIS was also simulcasted on 91.7 WFTI-FM in St. Petersburg; that station would cease operations in fall 2013, to allow for upgrades of adjacent channel WCIE and co-channel WJFH.

The Radio Training Network also has The JOY FM-branded stations in Dothan, Alabama (WIZB); Montgomery, Alabama (WPHH); Athens, Georgia (WMSL); and  Atlanta / Macon, Georgia (WVFJ-FM and WWWD), though these stations do not repeat WJIS 24/7.

Future stations
In May 2021, RTN reached a deal to purchase stations serving Tallahassee (WTSM) and Port St. Lucie (WHLG) from Horizon Broadcasting Company for $1.3 million. The sale was consummated on August 31, 2021.

HD radio
WCIE and WJIS broadcasts in the HD Radio format. On HD2, the station has The Joy FM Praise, a channel that features exclusively Christian praise songs. On HD3, the station has LF Radio, a progressive youth music channel. Both can be listened to online or via The Joy FM phone app.

Translators
In addition to the full-powered stations, The Joy FM is relayed by additional low-powered translators:

Two of its translators are leased out to Clear Channel Communications (now iHeartMedia) to rebroadcast their stations:
 W290BJ 105.9 MHz West Tampa, rebroadcasting WMTX's HD-2 signal; originally leased out to rebroadcast WFLA (AM)
 W237CW 95.3 MHz Pinellas Park, Florida, rebroadcasting WDAE

References

External links
 

Contemporary Christian radio stations in the United States
Radio stations established in 1986
1986 establishments in Florida
JIS